Mordellistena basilewskyi is a beetle in the genus Mordellistena of the family Mordellidae. It was described in 1955 by Ermisch.

References

basilewskyi
Beetles described in 1955